Zhengzhou railway station is a passenger railway station in Erqi District, Zhengzhou, Henan. It is located in the city center, about 1 km southwest to the Erqi Memorial Tower. As the junction of the important Beijing-Guangzhou Railway and Longhai Railway, the station is one of the busiest in China, and is called as "the heart of Chinese railway network".

History

Opened in 1904, it was a station on the Beijing-Hankou Railway (now part of Beijing-Guangzhou Railway). At the beginning, the station had only one platform and four tracks. In 1908, the Kaifeng-Luoyang Railway (now part of Longhai Railway) was put into operation, making the station an important railway junction.

In 1913, the station was renamed as Zheng County railway station. Ticket offices and platform canopies were put into use in 1928 and the freight yard was constructed in 1932.

During the Second Sino-Japanese War, the station was severely damaged due to air strike by the Japanese army in February 1938 and the tracks between Zhengzhou and Zhongmu were destroyed in May 1938 by the flood. Services were therefore suspended.

The station was taken over by the PLA in 1948 and the Zhengzhou Railway Administration Bureau was established in March 1949.

In October 1952, Mao Zedong visited the station. He told Teng Daiyuan, the Minister of Railways then, to highly value the pivotal status of the station, and instructed the station to be built as "the largest and the most complete passenger station in the Far East". The station has been expanded several times in the following decades. The freight yard was moved east to Erligang in 1953 to establish a new freight station and the marshalling yard was separated from the station in 1962 to form the current Zhengzhou North railway station. The station has become a dedicated passenger station since then. The main station building was completed in 1959, and canopies were added to the platforms in 1970s.

In 1987, a major renovation of the station started. The elevated waiting halls were completed and put into use in January 1992. The whole project lasted 12 years and was completed with the opening of the new main station building (current east station building) in 1999.

To relieve the traffic pressure on the east plaza of the station, construction of the west station building and west plaza was started in 2007. The west station building, together with new column-free platform canopies, the 7th and 8th elevated waiting halls and the 7th platform (current Platform 12 and 13) were put into use in 2010.

On 28 December 2013, with the opening of Zhengzhou Metro Line 1, the station began to have metro access on the west entrance.

The Zhengzhou-Jiaozuo Intercity Railway commenced operation in 2015, making the station an integrated railway hub with conventional long distance, high-speed and intercity train services.

Station layout

The two station buildings are connected by a channel for departing passengers with 10 waiting rooms on both sides of it at 2nd level, and two tunnels for passengers on arrival.

East station building
The east station building is also called as the main station building. The ticket office, offering 68 counters, is in the southern part on the 1st level. The main entrance is in the central part on the 1st level, with 4 escalators, 2 elevators and 2 staircases to the elevated waiting rooms on the 2nd level.

West station building
The west station building is to the west of the platforms.

Platforms and tracks
The station has 13 platforms and 20 tracks, of which 13 are for corresponding platforms, 3 are run-around loops and 4 are for freight trains passing the station. There is no through track for passenger trains in the station.

Metro station

Zhengzhou Railway Station is a metro station of Zhengzhou Metro Line 1. The station lies beneath the west plaza of the railway station.

A wall at the station concourse is decorated as a train carriage painted in typical Chinese railway livery of olive green.

Station layout
The station has 3 levels underground. The concourse is on the B2 level and a single island platform for Line 1 is on the B3 level. The part for Line 10 is under construction.

Future development
The station will become an interchange station of Line 1 and Line 10 upon the completion of Line 10.

Bus terminals
The station is an important urban public transit hub and several bus terminals are around the station, including the following.
 Railway Station North Terminus on the north side of the east plaza.
 Railway Station South Terminus on the south side of the east plaza.
 Railway Station (Yima Road) on Yima Road, the south side of the east plaza.
 Railway Station West Plaza on the west plaza.

See also
 Zhengzhou East railway station: the main high-speed railway station for Zhengzhou
 Zhengzhou Hangkonggang railway station: a high-speed railway station for Zhengzhou–Wanzhou high-speed railway and Zhengzhou–Fuyang high-speed railway
 Zhengzhou West railway station: a high-speed railway station on Xuzhou–Lanzhou high-speed railway

References

External links

Railway stations in Henan
Railway stations in Zhengzhou
Stations on the Longhai Railway
Stations on the Beijing–Guangzhou Railway
Railway stations in China opened in 1904
Stations of Zhengzhou Metro
Line 1, Zhengzhou Metro